General elections were held in Rhodesia on 30 July 1974. They saw the Rhodesian Front of Ian Smith re-elected, once more winning every one of the 50 seats elected by white voters.

Background
Since the previous election in 1970, the main African nationalist groups had changed their strategy and gone into exile in Zambia (and to a lesser extent Mozambique and Botswana), launching a war to overthrow white minority rule by force. The main African groups, the Zimbabwe African National Union (ZANU), Zimbabwe African People's Union (ZAPU) and the Front for the Liberation of Zimbabwe (FROLIZI), formed the African National Council under Bishop Abel Muzorewa to act as a collective political leadership and undertake any negotiations with the Rhodesian government.

In June 1974, the African National Council rejected settlement proposals which had come out of discussions between itself and the Rhodesian government. As the Rhodesian Parliament was into its fifth year, a general election became a real prospect. Timothy Gibbs of the Rhodesia Party announced on 9 June 1974 that he expected a September election, and on 19 June, Prime Minister Ian Smith announced that there would be an election imminently (he did not name the date). He also announced round table talks with Africans, including the Council of Chiefs. These talks were rejected by the African National Council as a waste of time.

Campaign
The Rhodesia Party, a white opposition party, had been formed by ex-Rhodesian Front MP Allan Savory in 1972. They were a moderate group which advocated more moves towards including the African population in internal politics. Early in June 1974, Savory made a speech at Hartley in which he was reported as saying that if he had been a black Rhodesian, he would be a terrorist. The uproar was such that Savory was forced from the leadership (replaced by Gibbs) and resigned from the party on 16 June. Despite the turmoil, the Rhodesia Party managed to nominate candidates in 40 out of the 50 seats.

There were also several Independent candidates including six right-wingers sponsored by the Rhodesian Group. The multi-racial Centre Party, which had provided the main opposition at the previous election, nominated a single candidate (who was from an Indian background). When nominations closed on 7 July, two seats (including that of Ian Smith) were elected unopposed. A victory by the Rhodesian Front was almost inevitable, although six seats were regarded as marginal.

The most marginal seat was clearly Salisbury City, where a right-wing Rhodesian Front candidate Ted Sutton-Pryce faced Dr Ahrn Palley, an Independent ex-member of the House of Assembly who had been a lone white opponent of UDI. In the 1970 election, the Rhodesian Front had defeated a mixed-race Independent candidate by only 40 votes, with a Centre Party candidate taking 157. Allan Savory, despite his departure from the Rhodesia Party, fought in Highlands North in the Salisbury suburbs as an Independent.

The Rhodesian Front responded to the challenge from the Rhodesia Party by attacking it for holding secret negotiations with the African National Council behind the backs of the Rhodesia government with the intent of undermining them. Ian Smith identified the Rhodesia Party with the 'liberal establishment' of Rhodesia, which had been responsible for the 1962 constitution and the inadequate arrangements of the Federation of Rhodesia and Nyasaland in 1953.

Electoral system
The electorate of Rhodesia returned 66 members of the House of Assembly of Rhodesia, in three different classes of seat:

 European roll seats: 50 members were returned from single-member constituencies by voters who were either of European, Asian or mixed (Coloured) descent.
 African roll seats: 8 members were returned from single-member constituencies by voters of African descent.
 Tribal seats: 8 seats were returned by Tribal electoral colleges made up of the Chiefs of the Tribes.

Both European and African rolls had a range of property qualifications. No change to boundaries or the qualification of voters was made compared to the 1970 election.

Results

European roll seats

African seats

Tribal seats
 HIGHVELD: Bartholomew Augustine Mabika
 KARIBA: Peter Mhletshwa Nkomo
 LOWVELD: Alford Dzingirai Chademana
 MANICA: †Naboth Absolom Gandazara
 PAGATI: Fani Mlingo
 PIONEER: †Josia Bvajurayi Hove
 TULU: Zephaniah Bafana Dube
 ZAMBEZI: †Takawira Aaron Mungate

Changes during the Assembly

Pioneer
Josia Hove died on 14 June 1976. At the byelection on 5 August 1976, Adam Hove was elected to replace him; Benjamin Panga Mbuisa and Twyman Mafohla Sibanda were unsuccessful candidates.

Party changes
The Land Tenure Amendment Bill of 1977 was highly controversial among Rhodesian Front MPs who objected to the opening of some areas previously designated for Europeans to African ownership. In a vote on 4 March 1977, twelve Rhodesian Front MPs voted against the Bill on a three line whip. They were Reginald Cowper, Dennis Fawcett Phillips, Richard Hope Hall, Robert McGee, John Newington, Peter Nilson, Gordon Olds, Ian Sandeman, Rodney Simmonds and Ted Sutton-Pryce. The Rhodesian press quickly nicknamed them The Dirty Dozen. In July 1977 these MPs formed the right-wing Rhodesian Action Party; this action precipitated the 1977 election as it deprived the government of the needed two-thirds majority to amend the constitution.

References

Elections in Rhodesia
Rhodesia
1974 in Rhodesia
July 1974 events in Africa
Rhodesia
Election and referendum articles with incomplete results